William Boulware Jr., (January 30, 1958 – March 27, 2022) better known by his ring name, Rocky King, was an American professional wrestler and referee in Jim Crockett Promotions and World Championship Wrestling.

Professional wrestling career
Boulware was homeless before he began his wrestling career. He was hired by Jim Crockett Jr. after he would hang around the wrestlers trying to get a job. Boulware, using the ring name Rocky King, started wrestling in 1985 in the National Wrestling Alliance's Jim Crockett Promotions in North Carolina. He began his career in the promotion as a jobber. He quickly improved and was often allowed a lot of offense during his jobber matches. He was a frequent opponent of the Four Horsemen.

After spending some time in Florida, King returned to North Carolina where he wrestled under promoter Pez Whatley. In 1987, he teamed with George South.

King was loosely associated with the Dudes With Attitudes in early 1990 during their feud with the Four Horsemen. In late 1990, after Crockett was purchased and renamed World Championship Wrestling, King got a gimmick change and became Little Richard Marley, manager of Michael Hayes and Jimmy Garvin, the Fabulous Freebirds. He helped them in their feud with the Southern Boys for a couple of months. At Starrcade in 1990, he inadvertently cost the Freebirds their match against Tommy Rich and Ricky Morton. After the match, the Freebirds attacked him. He then  went back to wrestling as Rocky King. King became a WCW referee before retiring in 1998.

In July 1999, he started BWA Professional Wrestling to give fans a family-oriented product on the independent scene. He also formed Boulware Enterprises, Inc. to run his promotion Boulware Wrestling Association. The BWA ran shows for churches, non-profit organizations and private organizations on the east coast. He partnered with Bill Heard III of Bill Heard Chevrolet in Atlanta, Georgia to operate Kids Nite Out, a program to keep kids off the streets. King also partnered with Frank Aldridge's World Wrestling Alliance 4 - WWA4, and together they ran hundreds of wrestling shows every year.

Death
Boulware died on March 27, 2022, aged 64.

References

External links
BWA news article

1960 births
2022 deaths
20th-century professional wrestlers
21st-century African-American people
African-American male professional wrestlers
American male professional wrestlers
Professional wrestling referees
Professional wrestling managers and valets
Sportspeople from Atlanta